Sesh Chithi is a Bengali drama film directed by Tanmoy Roy for D.Sudhir Productions. The music is directed by Sudhir Dutta. The film is about a handful of cunning family members who plan to take over a Zamindar bari after the death of the patriarch. Soumitra Chatterjee was felicitated on the sets for receiving Légion d'honneur. Soumitra Chatterjee and Lily Chakravarty will be seen in the film after the great success of Posto.

Plot 
An old widow, Mamatadevi, is reading out her husband's last letter and memorizing her old glorious days. Today Mamatadevi is going to an old people's home. Sibnath, Mamatadevi's husband, was a postmaster who belongs to the Zamindar family and Mamatadevi also used to live at the family home. Mamatadevi's daughter and son-in-law Ramen live in Mumbai. He is a businessman of antique products. On the day of retirement of Shibnath, his daughter Mou left Ranen for his torturing behavior and came to his father's house. But Shibnath died due to cardiac arrest on the same day. Suddenly, after 5 long years, Ranen came to his in-laws house to take Mou to Mumbai. But his intention was to take charge of the property. He was successful in this and planned to send his mother-in-law ito an old people's home.

Cast 
 Soumitra Chatterjee
 Lily Chakravarty
 Ritobroto Bhattacharya
 Moubani Sorcar
 Dulal Lahiri
 Biswajit Chakroborty
 Santwana Bose
 Sudhir Dutta
 Monica Ganguly - Canada
 Narugopal Mandal
 Dev Ganguly - Canada

Release 
The film released in West Bengal on 18 May 2018. The film was distributed by D. Sudhir Productions.

Soundtrack 
The songs for the soundtrack of Sesh Chithi are composed by D. Sudhir, music directed by Sudhir Dutta, lyrics by Rajib Dutta. The soundtrack was released on iTunes on 25 July 2017. The music was released physically on 25 July 2017 at Press club, Kolkata.

References

External links 
 

2018 films
Bengali-language Indian films
2010s Bengali-language films